Phi Fornacis is a single star in the southern constellation of Fornax. It has a white hue and is faintly visible to the naked eye with an apparent visual magnitude of 5.13. The distance to this object is approximately 154 light-years based on parallax, and it is drifting further away with a radial velocity of +19 km/s.

This is an A-type main-sequence star with a stellar classification of A2.5V. Phi Fornacis is 238 million years old and is spinning with a projected rotational velocity of 117 km/s. It has 2.1 times the mass of the Sun and 1.7 times the Sun's radius. The star is radiating 17 times the luminosity of the Sun from its photosphere at an effective temperature of 9,449 km/s.

References

A-type main-sequence stars
Circumstellar disks
Fornax (constellation)
Fornacis, Phi
Durchmusterung objects
015427
011477
0724